Squalidus argentatus is a species of cyprinid fish endemic to China, Russia, and Taiwan.

References

Squalidus
Taxa named by Henri Émile Sauvage
Taxa named by Claude Philibert Dabry de Thiersant
Fish described in 1874